Locust Hill is an unincorporated community in Knox County, in the U.S. state of Missouri.

History
Locust Hill was platted in 1870, and named for the locust trees near the elevated town site. A post office called Locust Hill was established in 1858, and remained in operation until 1907.

References

Unincorporated communities in Knox County, Missouri
Unincorporated communities in Missouri